The Miss North Dakota USA competition is the pageant that selects the representative for the state of North Dakota in the Miss USA pageant.  Since 2010, it is directed by Future Productions based in Savage, Minnesota.

North Dakota's highest placements were in 2014 and 2021, when Audra Mari and Caitlyn Vogel, respectively, placed as the first runner-up. Both had formerly placed as the first runner-up in Miss Teen USA 2011 and Miss Teen USA 2019, respectively.

Three Miss North Dakota USA titleholders have competed at Miss America and seven have competed at Miss Teen USA.

SaNoah LaRocque of Belcourt was crowned Miss North Dakota USA 2022 on May 1, 2022, at the Empire Arts Center in Grand Forks, North Dakota. She represented North Dakota for the title in Miss USA 2022.

Results summary
1st runners-up: Audra Mari (2014), Caitlyn Vogel (2021)
3rd runners-up: Judy Ann Slayton (1966)
4th runners-up: Elizabeth Ann Jaeger (1983)
Top 6: Juliette Spier (1996)

North Dakota holds a record of 5 placements at Miss USA.

Winners 

Color key

References

External links

North Dakota
North Dakota culture
Women in North Dakota
Recurring events established in 1952
1952 establishments in North Dakota